Monique de Saint-Martin (born 1940) is a sociologist born in France.

Introduction 
She is the director of studies at the Ecole des Hautes Etudes en Sciences Sociales (EHESS), Monique de Saint-Martinis is known for her work with Pierre Bourdieu. The focus of her research is on the sociology of elites, the sociology of the Grandes écoles and the sociology of employers. Prior to her position at the EHESS, she was involved with the Laboratory Council of the Center for the Study of Social Movements from 2005 to 2008.

Publications

References 

French sociologists
Writers about activism and social change
1940 births
Living people
French women sociologists